The Art of Living International Center is the headquarters of the Art of Living Foundation. The centre is located at 21 km southwest of Bangalore on Kanakapura road, at the top of the Panchagiri Hills. It is connected by Road via Nice Ring Road or Banshankari - Kanakapura Road.

History of the Center 

The Center was established in 1986 By Ravi Shankar to offer a base for his Art of Living Foundation. It draws 1.2 million visitors yearly for its yoga and meditation programs. The lifestyle is with a daily routine of group meditation, chanting, knowledge sessions, pujasand satsangs. It also hosts Panchkarma Center and Ayurvedic Hospital for Ayurvedic treatment.

Facilities

Vishalakshi Mantap 
Vishalakshi mantap Is a meditation hall consisting of five tiers with designs of lotus petals surrounding it. Symbols of all major religions of the world are depicted inside the hall.

Ayurveda hospital 
Sri Sri College of Ayurvedic Science & Research Hospital is a 172 bedded multi-speciality Ayurveda Hospital covering over 1 lakh sq ft area. It offers super speciality clinics in each branch of Ayurveda. Treatments range from traditional Panchakarma to modern cancer And diabetes treatment.

Sri Sri Panchakarma 
The Sri Sri Ayurveda Panchakarma Center has been built in the traditional Kerala style,.

Legal issues 
In 2011, a public-interest litigation petition filed in the Karnataka High Court alleged that some of the centre's structures encroached upon the Udipalya tank. The  government of Karnataka found on  inspection that the centre had encroached upon  of the tank area and issued a show cause notice.

References

External links 

 

Hindu organisations based in India
International Hindu organizations
Organisations based in Bangalore
Spiritual organizations
1986 establishments in Karnataka
Organizations established in 1986